Callaghan most commonly refers to O'Callaghan, an Anglicized Irish surname.

Callaghan may also refer to:

Places
 Callaghan, New South Wales, Australia
 Callaghan, Edmonton, Canada
 Callaghan, Virginia, United States
 Callaghan, Texas, United States

Fictional characters
 Clarissa Callaghan, from the video game Valkyria Chronicles III
 Robert Callaghan, the main antagonist from the movie Big Hero 6

Arts, entertainment, and media
 Georgina Callaghan, English singer and songwriter, who performs under the name Callaghan

See also
 
 Callahan (disambiguation)
 Callihan, a surname